The  is a Grade 2 race in Japan. It is held at Hanshin Racecourse in Takarazuka, Hyogo.

The race was first run in 2006 and is run over 1,400 metres (about 7 furlongs) on the inner turf course. It was upgraded to international status in 2009.

Due to the race calendar's arrangement, it was the final graded race organized by JRA in the 2012 and 2013 seasons, being held even after the Arima Kinen (which is usually the final graded race in the year).

List of winners

See also
 Horse racing in Japan
 List of Japanese flat horse races

References

External links 
Horse Racing in Japan
JRA International Races 2007 - Hanshin Cup

Turf races in Japan
Open mile category horse races